Delores Hall is an American stage and television actress who made her Broadway debut as a replacement in the ensemble of Hair.

Musical theatre career

Starting in 1968 and through at least the summer of 1969 she was an original member of the Los Angeles production of Hair. Wearing signature pigtails she opened the show, singing "Aquarius". Hall was still involved in Hair in 1971, having performed "Aquarius" and "The Lord's Prayer" at the show's birthday celebration at the Cathedral of St. John the Divine in New York and released on the album Divine Hair / Mass in F.

She played "Bread" in the 1972 musical Dude and performed in the original musical revues The Night That Made America Famous and Your Arms Too Short to Box with God, for which she won a Tony Award.

Her debut LP was released in 1973 by RCA Records titled "Hall-Mark" produced by Billy Jackson. She went on to star as "Jewel" in the original New York production of The Best Little Whorehouse in Texas.

Film/Television
Delores Hall's first movie was Scrooged in 1988. She played a security guard named Delores in Lethal Weapon 3 (1992). She played Ornella in Leap of Faith (1992). On television she was a regular on the first two seasons of Diagnosis: Murder, playing "Delores Mitchell".

Filmography

References

External links
 
 

African-American actresses
American film actresses
American musical theatre actresses
American television actresses
Tony Award winners
Year of birth missing (living people)
Place of birth missing (living people)
Living people
20th-century African-American women singers
20th-century American actresses
21st-century African-American women singers